Alexander Randolph (4 May 1922 – 27 April 2004) was a Bohemian-American designer of board games and writer. Randolph's game creations include TwixT, Breakthru, Hol's der Geier, Inkognito (with Leo Colovini), Raj, Ricochet Robot, and Enchanted Forest (with Michael Matschoss).

Biography
Randolph was a son of self-described "rich parents" who attended private school in Switzerland.
He spent his early years in various occupations, including military intelligence and as an advertising copy editor in Boston.

In 1961, Randolph moved to Japan and became a professional game developer, performing initial work on TwixT. During this time, he became a dan player in shogi.

In 1962, Randolph (along with Sid Sackson) was commissioned to start a new game division for Minnesota Mining and Manufacturing (also known as 3M). Through 3M, Randolph created and published such games as Breakthru, Evade, Oh-Wah-Ree, and TwixT.

Randolph moved to Venice, Italy in 1968, continuing his career as a game developer with the company Venice Connection established with Dario De Toffoli and Leo Colovini.

Randolph died aged 82 in Venice on 27 April 2004.

Recognition
In 2016, as a testimony to his career, Fabulous Games published ADDX - the first ever digital game from Alex Randolph.

Following Randolph's death, the Nuremberg Museum set up a special permanent collection of Randolph's games titled the Alexander Randolph Viewing Collection.

Awards

Spiel des Jahres
Game of the Year
1982 for Enchanted Forest

Children's Game of the Year
1989 for Gute Freunde
1997 for Leinen Los!

Special Awards
1996 Most Beautiful Game for Venice Connection
1988 Most Beautiful game for Inkognito

Origins Awards Hall of Fame

Hall of Fame
2011 induction as a designer
2011 induction of TwixT

References

Further reading
 Alex Randolph & Phillipe Evrard: Die Sonnenseite. Fragmente aus dem Leben eines Spieleerfinders.  Verlag Drei Hasen in der Abendsonne, Uehlfeld 2012, ISBN 978-3-941345-09-6

External links
Alex Randolph's games at BoardGameGeek
A Talk with Alex Randolph (1988 interview) 
An extremely brief biography and a comprehensive list of created games
Biography translated into English

1922 births
2004 deaths
Board game designers
American designers
American expatriates in Switzerland
American expatriates in Japan